Estonia participated in the X Summer Paralympic Games in Atlanta, United States. Estonian team representatives were Estonian Paralympic Committee president and Estonian Minister of Social Affairs Toomas Vilosius, head secretary Allan Kiil, secretary Maarit Vabrit and  coaches Margit Aidla, Mallika Koel, Rein Põldme and Rein Valdru. Only press member was Are Eller.

Estonia entered 10 athletes in the following sports:

Athletics: 4 female
Powerlifting: 1 male
Shooting: 1 male
Swimming:  4 female

Medallists

Top 6 Finishes

4th place
 Helena Silm – Athletics, Women's Long Jump F10-11

5th place
 Heli Kollom – Athletics, Women's Long Jump MH 
 Eela Kokk – Swimming, Women's 100 m Freestyle MH 
 Nadežda Maksimova – Swimming, Women's 100 m Breaststroke B3 
 Nadežda Maksimova – Swimming, Women's 100 m Freestyle B3

6th place
 Nadežda Maksimova – Swimming, Women's 50 m Freestyle B3
 Annika Raide – Swimming, Women's 100 m Freestyle B1

Results by event

Athletics
 Malle Juhkam
 Women's Long Jump MH – Final: 4.76 (→  Bronze Medal )
 Heli Kollom 
 Women's Long Jump MH – Final: 4.69 (→ 5. place )
 Annely Ojastu
 Women's 100 m T42-46 – Semifinal Heats: 4th 12,96 ; Final: 12,78 (→  Gold Medal )
 Women's 200 m T42-46 – Final: 26,26  (→  Silver Medal ) 
 Women's Long Jump F42-46 – Final: 5.37 m (→  Silver Medal )
 Helena Silm
 Women's 200 m T11 Semifinal Heat 1: dns (→ no ranking )
 Women's Long Jump F10-11 – Final: 4.92m (→ 6. place )
 Women's Pentathlon P10-12 – Final: 2713 pts (→  Bronze Medal )

Powerlifting
 Vassili Artamonov
 Men's Up To 56 kg  (→ nmr, no ranking )

Shooting
 Helmut Mänd
 Men's Air Rifle 3x40 SH1 – Preliminary: 26th 1132 (→ 26. place )
 Mixed Air Rifle Prone SH1 – Preliminary: 23rd 592 (→ 23. place )

Swimming
 Nadežda Maksimova 
 Women's 50 m Freestyle B3 – Final: 32,05 (→ 6. place )
 Women's 100 m Freestyle B3 – Final: 1.10,55 (→ 5. place )
 Women's 100 m Breaststroke B3 – Final: 1.35,16 (→ 5. place )
 Women's 200 m Medley B3 – Final: dq (→ no ranking )
 Eela Kokk
 Women's 50 m Freestyle MH  – Heats: 2nd 33,01 Final: 33,14 (→  Silver Medal ) 
 Women's 100 m Freestyle MH – Heats: 6th 1.14,66 ; Final: 1.13,25 (→ 6. place )
 Annika Raide 
 Women's 50 m Freestyle B1 – Heats: 11th 39,46 (→ did not advance )
 Women's 100 m Freestyle B1 – Heats: 8th 1.24,31 ; Final: 1.23,26 (→ 6. place )
 Women's 100 m Backstroke B1 – Heats: 7th 1.32,09 ; Final: dq
 Marge Kõrkjas
 Women's 50 m Freestyle B2 – Heats: 1st 30,35 ; Final: 29,90 (→  Gold Medal )
 Women's 100 m Freestyle B2 – Heats: 1st 1.09,12 ; Final: 1.07,43 (→  Gold Medal )
 Women's 100 m Backstroke B2 – Final: 1.22,43 (→  Silver Medal )

See also
1996 Summer Paralympics
Estonia at the Paralympics
Estonia at the 1996 Summer Olympics

External links
International Paralympic Committee
 Estonian Paralympic Committee

Nations at the 1996 Summer Paralympics
1996
Paralympics